T. fragilis may refer to:
 Tipula fragilis, Loew, 1863, a crane fly species in the genus Tipula
 Toxorhina fragilis, T. Loew, 1851, a crane fly species in the genus Toxorhina
 Trigonostemon fragilis, a plant species endemic to Vietnam

Synonyms 
 Tornus fragilis, a synonym for Rugulina fragilis, a gastropod species

See also 
 Fragilis (disambiguation)